The Walla Walla Basin Watershed Council (WWBWC) is a non-profit grassroots organization in the U.S. states of Washington and Oregon that fosters education and cooperation among all parties with interests in the Walla Walla River Watershed. Such cooperation and education leads to efforts that improve and maintain a healthy watershed for fish, invertebrates, plants, and people. The WWBWC, located in Milton-Freewater, Oregon was recognized by the Umatilla County Commissioners on May 18, 1994.  The council addresses issues on the Oregon portion of the watershed and collaborates with partners in Washington state.

The mission of the WWBWC is to protect the resources of the Walla Walla Watershed, deal with issues in advance of resource degradation, and enhance the overall health of the watershed, while also protecting, as far as possible, the welfare, customs, and cultures of all citizens residing in the basin.

Grant funding for WWBWC activities has come from a variety of sources, including the Oregon Watershed Enhancement Board (OWEB)  and the Natural Resources Conservation Service through the Walla Walla Watershed Alliance.

References

External links
Walla Walla Basin Watershed Council (official site)
Oregon Watershed Enhancement Board 
Walla Walla Watershed Alliance

Environmental organizations based in Oregon
Umatilla County, Oregon
Watersheds of the United States
Water organizations in the United States